The Belize women's cricket team toured Costa Rica in December 2019 to play a six-match bilateral Women's Twenty20 International (WT20I) series. The venue for all of the matches was the Los Reyes Polo Club in Guácima. These were the first WT20I matches for Belize since the ICC's announcement that full WT20I status would apply to all the matches played between women's teams of associate members after 1 July 2018. Belize won the series 5–1.

Squads

WT20I series

1st WT20I

2nd WT20I

3rd WT20I

4th WT20I

5th WT20I

6th WT20I

Notes

References

External links
 Series home at ESPN Cricinfo

Cricket in Costa Rica
Cricket in Belize
Associate international cricket competitions in 2019–20